Bandžov is a village in the municipality of Rožaje, Montenegro. It is located close to the Kosovan border.

Demographics
According to the 2011 census, its population was 159, all of them Albanians.

References

Populated places in Rožaje Municipality
Albanian communities in Montenegro